Welspun USA Inc is a subsidiary of India-based Welspun India Ltd. Welspun USA operates as one of the largest home textile divisions of the 3 billion dollar Welspun Group. Welspun USA has become a key supplier to 9 of the top 10 American retailers, manufacturing 1 in 5 towels in the US. Their product range includes Bath Towels, Bath Rugs, Accent & Area rugs, Down Alternative Comforters and Mattress Pads, and Fashion Bedding. With over 28 active patents, Welspun has gained notoriety for its HygroCotton technology, which has temperature regulating benefits and hollow core yarn to get softer with each wash. It was established in 2000, as a wholly owned subsidiary of Welspun Retail Ltd.

References

External links
Welspun USA Acquires Assets Of KOJO Worldwide
Drama In Diversity
Welspun's Big Data Play

Welspun Group
Manufacturing companies based in New York City
Textile companies of the United States
Manufacturing companies established in 2000
American subsidiaries of foreign companies